Hooton may refer to:

Places in England
 Hooton, Cheshire
 Hooton Park, disused aerodrome
 Hooton railway station
 Hooton Levitt, South Yorkshire
 Hooton Pagnell, South Yorkshire
 Hooton Roberts, South Yorkshire
 Slade Hooton, South Yorkshire

Other uses
Hooton (surname)

See also
 Houghton (disambiguation)